The Brasserie de Bellevaux is a Belgian craft brewery located in the ancienne commune of Bellevaux, municipality of Malmedy, Liège Province. The brewery produces five special beers including four called Bellevaux. These beers are brewed in ancient copper vats.

History
The brewery was founded in 2006 by the Dutch family of brewers Schuwer-Berhuis. The logo of the brewery represents three merlettes on three mascles.

Beers
Five homemade 33 cl beers unfiltered, unpasteurized and with high fermentation are also produced and sold. The brewery draws the water necessary to the making of the beers from a pure water spring in the Ardennes.
 The Bellevaux light ale: 7% alcohol by volume (ABV)
 The Bellevaux bitter: 6.8%  ABV
 The Bellevaux white: 4.8% ABV
 The Bellevaux black: 3.1% ABV
 The Triple Malmedy: 9% ABV

References

External links
http://www.brasseriedebellevaux.be/fr/

Bellevaux
Companies based in Liège Province
Malmedy